Mercatino Conca is a comune (municipality) in the Province of Pesaro e Urbino in the Italian region Marche, located about  northwest of Ancona and about  west of Pesaro.  It takes its name from the proximity of the Conca river's dry bed.

Mercatino Conca borders the following municipalities: Gemmano, Monte Cerignone, Monte Grimano, Sassocorvaro Auditore, Sassofeltrio, Tavoleto.

References

Cities and towns in the Marche